Visa requirements for Democratic Republic of the Congo citizens are administrative entry restrictions by the authorities of other states placed on citizens of the Democratic Republic of the Congo.

 Democratic Republic of the Congo citizens had visa-free or visa on arrival access to 41 countries and territories, ranking the Democratic Republic of the Congo passport 99th (tied with passports from Ethiopia, South Sudan and Sri Lanka) in terms of travel freedom according to the Henley Passport Index.

Visa requirements map

Visa requirements

Dependent, disputed, or restricted territories

Unrecognized or partially recognized countries

Dependent and autonomous territories

Non-visa restrictions

See also

Visa policy of the Democratic Republic of the Congo
Democratic Republic of the Congo passport
Visa requirements for Burundian citizens
Visa requirements for Kenyan citizens
Visa requirements for Rwandan citizens
Visa requirements for South Sudanese citizens
Visa requirements for Tanzanian citizens
Visa requirements for Ugandan citizens

References and Notes
References

Notes

Congo
Foreign relations of the Democratic Republic of the Congo